Thomas Grafas (born 10 February 1970), son of former Greek football player Dimitris Grafas, is a Greek retired football defender and manager.

References

1970 births
Living people
Greek football managers
Egaleo F.C. managers
Iraklis Psachna F.C. managers
Apollon Pontou FC managers
Athlitiki Enosi Larissa F.C. managers
Pierikos F.C. managers
AO Chania F.C. managers
Veria F.C. managers
A.E. Sparta P.A.E. managers
Trikala F.C. managers
Olympiacos Volos F.C. managers
Footballers from Athens
Greek footballers